Stair House is a late 16th- or early 17th-century house near the village of Stair, in Ayrshire, Scotland. It was the birthplace of John Dalrymple, 1st Earl of Stair (1648–1707). It remains in use as a house, and is a category A listed building.

In the 20th century it was owned by Robert 'Bobby' Corbett, second son of Lord Rowallan. His grave is in Stair churchyard.

References

Houses in East Ayrshire
Category A listed buildings in East Ayrshire
Houses completed in the 16th century